Catabenoides is a genus of moths of the family Noctuidae.

Species
 Catabenoides lazelli Becker & Miller, 2002
 Catabenoides seorsa (Todd, 1972)
 Catabenoides terens (Walker, 1857)
 Catabenoides terminellus (Grote, 1883)
 Catabenoides vitrina (Walker, 1857)

Cuculliinae